Ioannis Pavlidis is a Greek-American bioscientist focusing on the physiological basis of human behavior, human-computer interaction, mobile computing, and medical imaging, currently the Eckhard Pfeiffer Professor at the University of Houston. Pavlidis conducted a study in  2020 that analysed the effects of multitasking at a workplace, and found them to be negative.

References

Year of birth missing (living people)
Living people
University of Houston faculty
21st-century American biologists
Greek biologists